The Moldavian Soviet Encyclopedia (Moldovan Cyrillic: Енчиклопедия Советикэ Молдовеняскэ) was a multi purpose Encyclopedia of Moldavia, issued in the USSR. Moldavian Soviet Encyclopedia was printed in 8 volumes in Chișinău from 1970 to 1981. An additional  volume, Moldavian SSR, was published in both Moldavian and Russian in 1979.

See also
Great Soviet Encyclopedia

External links
  http://dic.academic.ru/dic.nsf/enc3p/201150

Romanian encyclopedias
Moldovan literature
Soviet culture
Publications established in 1970
Publications disestablished in 1981
Moldavian Soviet Socialist Republic
National Soviet encyclopedias
20th-century encyclopedias
1970 establishments in the Soviet Union